Pötzsch is a German language surname. It stems from a reduced form of the male given name Peter – and may refer to:
Anett Pötzsch (1960), German former figure skater
Oliver Pötzsch (1970), German author of popular fiction

References 

German-language surnames
Surnames from given names